Late Date with Ruth Brown is an album by vocalist Ruth Brown featuring tracks recorded in 1959 and released on the Atlantic label.

Reception

Allmusic awarded the album 4 stars stating "this session reminded those who had forgotten that Brown could also hold her own with sophisticated material as well as sexy stuff".

Track listing
 "It Could Happen to You" (Jimmy Van Heusen, Johnny Burke) – 3:07
 "Why Don't You Do Right?" (Kansas Joe McCoy) – 2:12
 "Bewitched, Bothered and Bewildered" (Richard Rodgers, Lorenz Hart) – 4:32
 "I'm Just a Lucky So-and-So" (Duke Ellington, Mack David) – 3:32
 "I Can Dream, Can't I?" (Sammy Fain, Irving Kahal) – 2:36
 "You and the Night and the Music" (Arthur Schwartz, Howard Dietz) – 2:31
 "You'd Be So Nice to Come Home To" (Cole Porter) – 1:52
 "We'll Be Together Again" (Carl T. Fischer, Frankie Laine) – 4:18
 "I'm Beginning to See the Light" (Ellington, Don George, Johnny Hodges, Harry James) – 2:28
 "I Loves You, Porgy" (George Gershwin, Ira Gershwin) – 2:42
 "No One Ever Tells You" (Hub Atwood, Carroll Coates) – 4:06
 "Let's Face the Music and Dance" (Irving Berlin) – 2:07

Personnel 
 Ruth Brown – vocal
Joe Cabot, Bernie Glow, Ernie Royal, Doc Severinsen – trumpet (tracks 4, 6, 11 & 12)
Bob Alexander  (tracks 2, 4–7, 9, 11 & 12), Morton Bullman (tracks 2, 5, 7 & 9), Mervin Gold (tracks 4, 6, 11 & 12), Frank Rehak  (tracks 2, 4–7, 9, 11 & 12), Chauncey Welsch  (tracks 2, 4–7, 9, 11 & 12) – trombone
 Romeo Penque – alto saxophone, oboe, flute (tracks 1, 3, 4, 6, 8 & 10–12) 
George Berg – tenor saxophone flute (tracks 1, 3, 4, 6, 8 & 10–12) 
Phil Bodner, Jerry Sanfino, Joe Soldo – saxophone (tracks 4, 6, 11 & 12) 
Hank Jones – piano 
Al Caiola (tracks 1, 3, 8 & 10), Mundell Lowe (tracks 2, 4–7, 9, 11 & 12)  – guitar 
Milt Hinton – bass
Sol Gubin (tracks 4, 6, 11 & 12), Don Lamond  (tracks 1–3, 5 & 7–10)  – drums 
Arnold Eidus, Felix Giglio, Harry Katzman, Harry Melnikoff, Julius Held, Leo Kruczek, Tony Bambino – violin (tracks 1, 3, 8 & 10)
Eugene Orloff – violin, concertmaster (tracks 1, 3, 8 & 10)
Richard Wess – arranger, conductor

References 

1959 albums
Ruth Brown albums
Atlantic Records albums
Albums produced by Ahmet Ertegun
Albums produced by Nesuhi Ertegun